Henri-Claude Moreau (born 5 August 1945) is a French boxer. He competed in the men's light heavyweight event at the 1972 Summer Olympics.

References

External links
 

1945 births
Living people
French male boxers
Olympic boxers of France
Boxers at the 1972 Summer Olympics
Place of birth missing (living people)
Light-heavyweight boxers